Imre Furmen (14 August 1933 – 5 February 2021) was a Hungarian cyclist. He competed in two events at the 1952 Summer Olympics.

He died on 5 February 2021.

References

External links
 

1933 births
2021 deaths
Hungarian male cyclists
Olympic cyclists of Hungary
Cyclists at the 1952 Summer Olympics
Cyclists from Budapest